Mark Vincent Courtney (born 25 March 1961) is an English former motorcycle speedway rider who rode in the British League for several teams between 1978 and his retirement in 1993. He returned to racing in 2000, retiring again in 2003, after which he became a mechanic, most notably for Chris Harris.

Biography
Courtney was born in Braintree, Essex in 1961 and moved with his family to Workington when he was twelve. Courtney's uncle and brother were speedway riders, and he began his speedway career with second-half races at Workington in 1977. He joined the Barrow team in the National League the following year, moving to Middlesbrough in 1979. He won the British Junior Championship in 1980 and moved up to the British League on loan with the Leicester Lions the same year, splitting his time between the two leagues. In 1982 he moved to Leicester full-time after a 15,000 transfer, and in the same year finished as runner-up in the European Under-21 final. In 1983 he was the Lions' highest-average rider, and represented England four times. At the end of the 1983 season, Courtney requested a transfer and signed to ride for the Belle Vue Aces in 1984, and then King's Lynn Stars in 1985. In 1986 he dropped back down to the National League with Middlesbrough, while also making fifteen appearances for Belle Vue. A successful three-year spell at Berwick between 1988 and 1990 was followed by seasons at Glasgow, Rye House and then Middlesbrough. He was sacked by Middlesbrough at the end of the 1993 season after an incident involving a fire extinguisher at a hotel in Swindon. This effectively triggered his retirement from the sport, Courtney later moving into the building trade.

After being arrested in May 1997, Courtney was sentenced to six years in prison in 1998 for his part in a plot to import cannabis with a street value of 500,000 into the UK.

After seven years away from racing, Courtney, released from prison on licence, returned in 2000 with Glasgow, moving on to Trelwany midway through 2001. He moved on to his final club, Rye House, in 2002, finally retiring at the end of the 2003 season.

Courtney's sons Scott and Jamie followed him into speedway racing. Scott is currently Berwick Bandits team manager.
Mark Courtney also became part of Chris Harris's grand prix team, becoming head of his race team in 2011.

References

1961 births
People from Braintree, Essex
Living people
British speedway riders
English motorcycle racers
Leicester Lions riders
Middlesbrough Bears riders
Belle Vue Aces riders
King's Lynn Stars riders
Newcastle Diamonds riders
Berwick Bandits riders
Glasgow Tigers riders
Rye House Rockets riders
Trelawny Tigers riders